Pomata District is one of seven districts of the Chucuito Province in Puno Region, Peru.

Geography 
Other mountains are listed below:

Ethnic groups 
The people in the district are mainly indigenous citizens of Aymara descent. Aymara is the language which the majority of the population (80.79%) learnt to speak in childhood, 18.64% of the residents started speaking using the Spanish language (2007 Peru Census).

Authorities

Mayors 
 2015-today: Fredy Gualberto Castillo Venegaa
 2011-2014: Walter Agustín Quispe Galindo.
 2007-2010: Mario Calani Morales

See also 
 Administrative divisions of Peru

References

External links 
 INEI Peru